Ubar may refer to:
 Ab Bar
 Iram of the Pillars, a lost city of Arabia
 The Wabar or Ubar craters, near the lost Arabian city
U bar, a letter of the Latin alphabet, thats formed from U with the addition of a bar: Ʉ, ʉ.
μbar, a unit of pressure
 One of several names for the legendary Atlantis of the Sands